Fair Game is a 1986 Australian action thriller film directed by Mario Andreacchio from a screenplay by Rob George. Quentin Tarantino enthuses about the movie in the 2008 documentary Not Quite Hollywood.

Plot
A young woman (Cassandra Delaney) who runs a wildlife sanctuary in the Outback is menaced by three kangaroo hunters who have entered the sanctuary looking for new game.

Cast
 Cassandra Delaney as Jessica
 Peter Ford as Sunny
 David Sandford as Ringo
 Garry Who as Sparks
 Don Barker as Frank
 Carmel Young as Moira
 Tony Clay as Derek
 Adrian Shirley as Victor

Production
The movie was shot in South Australia with the assistance of the Australian Film Commission. Director Mario Andreacchio later said:
Fair Game came out of a situation where we were wanting to make a movie that was a B-grade video suspense thriller. I wanted to treat it like comic book violence – it was always like a comic book study of violence. What amazed me and the thing I found quite disappointing was that it started to become a cult film in some parts of the world and people were taking it seriously. And that, for me, became a real turning point. I thought, if people are taking this seriously, then I don't think I can make this sort of material.

Box office
Fair Game grossed $13,902 at the box office in Australia.

See also
 Cinema of Australia

References

External links
 
 
 Fair Game at Oz Movies

1986 films
Australian action thriller films
Films shot in Adelaide
Rape and revenge films
1986 action thriller films
Films directed by Mario Andreacchio
Australian action adventure films
1980s English-language films
1980s Australian films